The Romanian peasant music is the music of the Romanian peasants. The Romanian peasant music has largely disappeared, but it can still be found in isolated villages in regions like Maramureş, Hunedoara, Tulcea or Bucovina. The romanian peasant music that has survived in the south (old Wallachia) has a heavy turkish influence, dated back to the Ottoman Empire suzerainty. 

The Romanian peasant music must be distinguished from the lăutărească music, and from the Romanian popular music. A person who plays peasant music is sometimes called rapsod.

References

See also
 Music of Romania
 Lăutari
 Romanian popular music

Romanian music